Beachy Head Lighthouse is a lighthouse located in the English Channel below the cliffs of Beachy Head in East Sussex. It was the last traditional-style 'rock tower' (i.e. offshore lighthouse) to be built by Trinity House.

Construction 
Beachy Head Lighthouse was built to replace the Belle Tout Lighthouse on top of the cliffs of Beachy Head, which was completed in 1834. This was not as successful as had been hoped, as its light was frequently obscured by sea mists. Thus it was decided to build a replacement at the foot of the cliffs. Belle Tout lighthouse was decommissioned in 1902, and still exists as a holiday home.

In 1900 to 1902 under the direction of Sir Thomas Matthews, the Trinity House Engineer-in-Chief, Beachy Head Lighthouse was built, sited about 165 metres seawards from the base of the cliffs. For the construction, a temporary cable car from the cliff was installed for the transport of workers and stones to an iron ocean platform adjacent to the lighthouse. 3,660 tons of Cornish granite were used in the construction of the tower.

The lighthouse was equipped with a first-order revolving catadioptric optic made up of three double panels, giving two white flashes every 20 seconds; the lightsource was a Matthews-designed paraffin vapour burner. The newly built lighthouse was also provided with an explosive fog signal, which was sounded every five minutes in foggy weather; it involved the keepers attaching a small explosive charge together with a detonator to each arm of a jib located on the gallery of the lighthouse; when winched into place, connection was made with a dynamo-electric firing machine inside the lantern, from where the charge was remotely fired.

Operation 
For more than 80 years, the red-and-white striped tower was staffed by three lighthouse keepers. Their primary job was to maintain the revolving light, which was then visible  out to sea. For most of the 20th century cooking was done on a solid-fuel range and the accommodation was lit by paraffin lamps. Electricity first reached the lighthouse in 1975, whereupon an electric lamp was installed in the optic. The explosive fog signal remained in use until 1976 (when it was replaced by an 'ELG 500' electric emitter); at the time Beachy Head was one of the last lighthouses still using explosive signals. The lighthouse was fully automated in 1983 and the keepers withdrawn.

A chalk fall on the cliff in 1999 severed the electric cable; during its repair the lamp and fog signal were replaced and upgraded. In February 2011, the work was undertaken and light range reduced by the installation of a new LED navigation light system. The old lens, though no longer in use, was left in situ. The fog signal was also discontinued at this time.

Trinity House announced in 2011 that it could no longer afford to repaint the distinctive red and white stripes and that it would have to be left to return to its natural granite grey. It stated that because boats now have high tech navigational systems the day marker stripes are no longer essential. However, a sponsored campaign to keep the stripes was launched in October 2011. The required £27,000 was raised. The tower repainting was completed in October using a team including two abseilers. Five coats of paint were applied to the copper lantern at the top and three on each hoop of the tower.

In 2019 with the impending demolition of the Royal Sovereign Lighthouse, Trinity House has said it will increase the strength of Beachy Head light to compensate for the loss of Royal Sovereign.

Gallery

In popular culture
The lighthouse was a setting in an episode of The Prisoner called The Girl Who Was Death.
The lighthouse was shown in the 1968 film, Chitty Chitty Bang Bang after the car falls off the cliff and flies for the first time.

See also

List of lighthouses in England

References

External links

 Trinity House

Lighthouses completed in 1902
Grade II listed buildings in East Sussex
Grade II listed lighthouses
Lighthouses in England
Lighthouses of the English Channel